Gurban Osman oghlu Gurbanov (born 13 April 1972) is an Azerbaijani football manager and former player who manages FK Qarabagh. He played as a forward. Starting out with local club Kur in 1988, Gurbanov had a decorated 18-year career. He scored 178 goals in 399 league matches. With 14 goals in 68 matches, he is also the Azerbaijan national team's all-time leading goalscorer in international matches. From 2017 to 2018 he was the manager of the Azerbaijan national team.

Gurbanov has won a total of 14 trophies, five as a player and nine as a manager.

Playing career
He started his career in Kur, and has since played for Mertskhali Ozurgeti, Daşqın Zaqatala, Alazani Gurjaani, Turan Tovuz, Neftchi Baku, Dinamo Stavropol, Baltika Kaliningrad, Fakel Voronezh and Volgar Gazprom. The last club he played for was Inter Baku. In the 1996–97 season, Gurbanov was the leading scorer in the Azerbaijan Premier League for Neftchi with 25 goals.  The striker was named Azerbaijan's Player of the Year once, in 2003.

International career
Gurbanov debuted for the Azerbaijan national team in their very first match on 17 September 1992, and as of January 2006 he has scored 14 goals in 68 international matches, which is the national team goal scoring record.

Managerial career 
After Gurbanov ended his football player's career, he became sport director of the club Inter. In summer 2006 he was appointed head coach of Neftchi Baku.

At the beginning of the season 2008–09 he became head coach of FK Qarabağ to replace Rasim Kara.

In 2010, he became the most successful Azerbaijani manager in European competitions with 16 wins.

In May 2014, he guided Qarabağ to their second Azerbaijani league title after 21 years. In July 2014, he became the second Azerbaijani manager to reach the European Cups group stage, as Qarabağ qualified for the 2014–15 UEFA Europa League group stage, beating Twente and being the second Azerbaijani team to advance to this stage in a European competitions.

In 2017, FK Qarabağ, managed by Gurbanov, became the first Azerbaijani team to reach the group stages of the UEFA Champions League.

On 3 November 2017, Gurbanov was appointed manager of the Azerbaijan national team. A year later, on 8 December 2018, he resigned.

Personal life
Gurban is the brother of Azerbaijani former footballer Musa Gurbanov. He is the father of Azerbaijan national team player Musa Gurbanli.

In 2012, he campaigned to stop domestic violence.

Career statistics 
Scores and results list Azerbaijan's goal tally first, score column indicates score after each Gurbanov goal.

Managerial statistics 
Coaching record

Honours

Player
Turan Tovuz
Azerbaijan Premier League: 1993–94

Neftchi Baku
Azerbaijan Premier League: 1996–97, 2003–04, 2004–05
Azerbaijan Cup: 2003–04

Individual
Azerbaijani Footballer of the Year: 2003
Azerbaijan Premier League top scorer: 1996–97
Azerbaijan all-time top scorer: 14 goals

Manager
Qarabağ
Azerbaijan Premier League: 2013–14, 2014–15, 2015–16, 2016–17, 2017–18, 2018–19, 2019–20
Azerbaijan Cup: 2008–09, 2014–15, 2015–16, 2016–17

References

External links 
Video about career of Gurban Gurbanov
 

1972 births
Living people
Association football forwards
Soviet footballers
Azerbaijani footballers
Azerbaijan international footballers
Turan-Tovuz IK players
FC Dynamo Stavropol players
FC Fakel Voronezh players
FC Baltika Kaliningrad players
FC Volgar Astrakhan players
Shamakhi FK players
FC Alazani Gurjaani players
Azerbaijan Premier League players
Russian Premier League players
Azerbaijani expatriate footballers
Azerbaijani expatriate sportspeople in Russia
Expatriate footballers in Russia
Azerbaijani football managers
Neftçi PFK managers
Qarabağ FK managers
Azerbaijan national football team managers
People from Zaqatala District
Neftçi PFK players